Foundation for the Rights of Future Generations (FRFG), also known as Stiftung für die Rechte zukünftiger Generationen (SRzG), is a German think tank and activist group focused on intergenerational justice and sustainability. Established in 1997, the foundation is based in Stuttgart, Germany. The FRFG has been called the most important extra-parliamentary think tank on the topic of intergenerational justice in Germany, and has members from around the world. The organization rose to national prominence while campaigning to include a provision for sustainability and the protection of future generations into the German constitution. It has also campaigned for age-independent voting rights. FRFG publishes the English-language journal Intergenerational Justice Review in collaboration with the University of Tübingen.

FRFG is associated with the United Nations Economic and Social Council (ECOSOC) and the Department of Public Information (DPI).

Background
The organization first started as a "garage foundation" in 1996, when Jörg Tremmel and two of his friends began publishing press release and position papers on labor market policy and the rights of future generations. Their efforts soon came to the attention of the Frankfurter Allgemeine Zeitung and other media outlets.

After securing funding from donors, the SRzG was formally established as a foundation in December 1997. According to the foundation, there were five co-founders between the ages of 18 and 27. They came together as a non-partisan alliance of students who wanted to promote intergenerational equity in terms of the environment, as well as the economy. In 2006, political scientist Martin Thunert characterized the FRFG as an activist "mini-tank" running on a shoestring budget compared to state-funded think tanks and academically oriented institutes in Germany.

In the early years, Tremmel adopted a confrontational approach, telling journalists that he was campaigning against "generational fraud" in the provision of pensions. In 2004, Tremmel appeared on a BBC Two drama-documentary, If...The Generations Fall Out, saying, "We are not going to keep quiet when a band of pampered pensioners steal the future from us."

In practice, Tremmel and his colleagues realized that working collaboratively would better serve the interests of young people. FRFG has since stated that it "rejects notions of generational war, has a culture of discussion and dialogue, and focuses on learning about intergenerational issues and change." Tremmel himself presented the foundation's position paper on pensions to Walter Riester, the German Federal Minister for Labor and Social Affairs. More recently, the FRFG has advocated augmenting the responsibilities of Germany's Parliamentary Advisory Council for Sustainable Development (PBnE), while also promoting an extra-parliamentary Ecological Council, and positioning the Federal Constitutional Court as the "guardian of intergenerational justice".

Activities

Symposia 
One of the early successes of the SRzG was its annual youth congress, gathering young people to discuss political issues in working groups and develop resolutions. The first youth congress in 1997 called for new intergenerational contracts requiring each generation to act in such a way that future generations would have equal opportunity and freedom to satisfy their own needs.

Its first international conference took place from August 6 to 12, 2000, inviting 400 young people between the ages of 18 and 30 to the First European Youth Congress in Hanover, Germany, during Expo 2000. Organized in conjunction with the Young European Federalists, Rotaract, AIESEC, and other groups, there were around 20 working groups preparing material in advance of the event through an "Internet University" including chatrooms hosted by the SRzG.

Campaign to amend the Basic Law 
In the early years, the organization instigated a high-profile campaign to enshrine the principles of sustainability and protection of future generations in the German constitution. Members of the CDU, SPD, Greens, and FDP in the German Bundestag drew up a cross-party motion to anchor intergenerational justice in the Basic Law, and presented it on July 14, 2006. The Foundation for the Rights of Future Generations helped to moderate their meetings and supported their deliberations with comments from prominent constitutional lawyers.

Their proposal was for a new Article 20b of the Basic Law, which said, "The state must in its actions consider the principle of sustainability and must protect the interests of future generations." In addition, they proposed an amendment to Article 9, rewording the second paragraph to state that "In budgetary management, the federal and state governments must taken into account the requirements of macroeconomic equilibrium, the principle of sustainability, and the interests of future generations."

In November 2006, 105 young members of the Bundestag introduced the draft intergenerational justice law. In October 2009, Jörg Tremmel of the SRzG was invited to an expert hearing convened by the Parliamentary Advisory Council for Sustainability. No decision on the proposals had been reached by the end of the 2009 legislative session due to lack of consensus. Nonetheless, during the banking and financial crisis of 2008 to 2009, the foundation successfully pushed to have a debt brake enshrined into the Basic Law, by making the approval of any debt stimulus package contingent on it inclusion.

Youth suffrage campaign 
In 2008, it started the campaign, "Wir wollen wählen" (We want to vote). Following the federal election in 2013, the SRzG supported an election review complaint filed with the Federal Constitutional Court of Germany on behalf of 25 plaintiffs, including 15 children and teenagers between the age of 9 and 17. According to the complaint, 13 million German citizens were unfairly excluded from voting based on their age. The court dismissed the complaint on the basis that neither the Article 1 (the guarantee of human dignity) nor Article 20 (the democratic principle) of the Basic Law were violated by setting a minimum voting age.

Generational Justice Prize 
Through the so-called “Generational Justice Award”, endowed with €10,000, young scientists are encouraged to take a close look on issues concerning the future. Numerous politicians asked for FRFG's advice on questions concerning Generational Justice, among them the German ministers for Work (Reform of the pension scheme), and the minister for Justice (establishment of Generational Justice in the German constitution).

Publications 
Starting in 2001, it published a magazine, Generationengerechtigkeit!, which subsequently became the peer-reviewed Journal für Generationengerechtigkeit, and later merged with the English-language Intergenerational Justice Review, published jointly with the University of Tübingen. In 2008, SRzG published a book on age-independent voting rights, Wahlrecht ohne Altersgrenze?: Verfassungsrechtliche, demokratietheoretische und entwicklungspsychologische Aspekte.

Scientific Advisory Council
FRFG is supported by a scientific advisory council that includes Dr. Mihajlo Mesarovic (Club of Rome), Dr. Radermacher (Club of Rome), Dr. Ernst Ulrich von Weizsäcker (Club of Rome), Lord Ralf Dahrendorf (UK House of Lords), Wolfgang Seiler (KIT) and Kennedy Graham (UN University).

Awards
FRFG received the Theodor-Heuss-Medal and the Medal for Good Citizenship of the town of Oberursel for its engagement.

References

Think tanks based in Germany